

The Cary Memorial Library (est.1869) is the main branch of the public library in Lexington, Massachusetts.  It is located at 1874 Massachusetts Avenue in the town center.

History

"In 1868 Mrs. Maria Hastings Cary proposed to give $1000 to Lexington to establish a free public library, on condition that a similar sum should be raised in money or in books for the same object. ... The proposition was gratefully accepted and the conditions complied with, by the donation of the other libraries to this object and an appropriation of money by the town. Such was the origin of Cary Library, so named in honor of the original donor." "In 1871, Mrs. Cary being pleased with the public appreciation and usefulness of the library, gave $5000 towards a permanent endowment."

By 1890, the library held "between 12,000 and 13,000 volumes. It is highly prized by the people and extensively used; more than 25,000 volumes have been drawn from it during the last year. From 500 to 800 new books are added annually. ... A branch library is maintained in the east village."

The library building was built with a bequest from Alice Butler Cary, adopted daughter of Maria Hastings Cary. Construction began in 1905 and was completed in 1906. The architect was Willard D. Brown of Boston, a Lexington resident. The building has been expanded several times since.

In fiscal year 2008, the town of Lexington spent 1.81% ($1,926,194) of its budget on the library—some $63 per person.

Image gallery

See also
 Stone Building (Lexington, Massachusetts)

References

Further reading
 Report of the Free Public Library Commission of Massachusetts. 1899. Google books
 Charles Hudson and Lexington Historical Society. History of the Town of Lexington, Middlesex County, Massachusetts. Houghton Mifflin, 1913; p. 405+ Google books
 Paula D. Watson. Carnegie Ladies, Lady Carnegies: Women and the Building of Libraries. Libraries & Culture, Vol. 31, No. 1, Reading & Libraries I (Winter, 1996)

External links
 
 Flickr. Photo of library, 2008

Government agencies established in 1869
1869 establishments in Massachusetts
Public libraries in Massachusetts
Libraries in Middlesex County, Massachusetts
Buildings and structures in Lexington, Massachusetts